is a Japanese anime screenwriter.

Works
Fruits Basket (2001) Series Composition
Princess Tutu (2002–2003) Script
Twin Spica (2002–2003) Script
Fushigiboshi no Futagohime (2005–2006) Series Composition
Higurashi no Naku Koro ni (2006) Script
Fushigiboshi no Futagohime Gyu! (2006) Series Composition
Kanamemo (2009) Series Composition
The World's Greatest First Love (2011) Series Composition
GO-GO Tamagotchi! (2014–2015) Script
Rilu Rilu Fairilu ~ Yousei no Door ~ (2016–2017) Script
Number24 (2020) Series Composition

References

External links

Anime screenwriters
Living people
Year of birth missing (living people)